Ivo Varbanov (born 1 March 1987) is a Bulgarian footballer, who currently plays for Spartak Pleven.

Career
He played previously for Belite orli, FC Sportist Svoge and on loan for Botev Krivodol as a defender.

In July 2018, Varbanov joined Spartak Pleven.

Notes 

1987 births
Living people
Footballers from Sofia
Bulgarian footballers
First Professional Football League (Bulgaria) players
Second Professional Football League (Bulgaria) players
PFC Belite Orli Pleven players
FC Sportist Svoge players
FC Botev Krivodol players
New Radiant S.C. players
PFC Spartak Pleven players
Bulgarian expatriate footballers
Bulgarian expatriate sportspeople in the Maldives
Expatriate footballers in the Maldives
Association football defenders